The 27th Senate District of Wisconsin is one of 33 districts in the Wisconsin State Senate.  Located in south-central Wisconsin, the district comprises most of western Dane County, northern Green County, eastern Iowa County, eastern Sauk County, and parts of western Columbia County.  It includes the cities of Baraboo, Middleton, Portage, and Verona, and the southern half of the city of Fitchburg.  The district also contains landmarks such as Blue Mound State Park, Devil's Lake State Park, and Mirror Lake State Park.

Current elected officials
Dianne Hesselbein is the senator representing the 27th district since January 2023. She previously served ten years in the Wisconsin State Assembly, representing the 79th district.

Each Wisconsin State Senate district is composed of three Wisconsin State Assembly districts.  The 27th Senate district comprises the 79th, 80th, and 81st Assembly districts.  The current representatives of those districts are:
 Assembly District 79: Alex Joers (D–Middleton)
 Assembly District 80: Mike Bare (D–Verona)
 Assembly District 81: Dave Considine (D–Baraboo)

The district is located almost entirely Wisconsin's 2nd congressional district, which is represented by U.S. Representative Mark Pocan.  The area of the district in Columbia County, however, falls within Wisconsin's 6th congressional district, which is represented by U.S. Representative Glenn Grothman.

Past senators
The district has previously been represented by:

Note: the boundaries of districts have changed repeatedly over history. Previous politicians of a specific numbered district have represented a completely different geographic area, due to redistricting.

Notes

External links
District Website
Senator Erpenbach's Website

Wisconsin State Senate districts
Green County, Wisconsin
Lafayette County, Wisconsin
Rock County, Wisconsin
Dane County, Wisconsin
1856 establishments in Wisconsin